Siviero is an Italian surname. Notable people with this surname include:

 Enzo Siviero (born 1945), Italian architect, engineer and writer
 Gustavo Siviero (born 1969), Argentine former professional footballer 
 Jorge Luis Siviero (born 1952), former Uruguayan football player and coach
 Rodolfo Siviero (1911-1983), Italian secret agent, art historian and intellectual
 Tiziano Siviero (born 1957), Italian rally co-driver

See also 
 Sivieri

Italian-language surnames